Sayed Awad (1926–2000) was an Egyptian composer of contemporary classical music. He began his career as a violinist for the orchestra of the Cairo Opera House and later lived in Jordan. He studied in Moscow with the Russian violinist and conductor David Oistrakh and received a Ph.D. in music there in 1968.

Sayed Awad was a music teacher at Yarmouk University (Irbid-Jordan) from 1982-1986, he taught; violin, music theory and history.

Awad had a lot of influence on the music movement in Jordan and Egypt, he was the first one to compose an orchestral work for the Oud and the orchestra, which was dedicated to his student and close friend Seifed Din Abdoun.

He is best known for his Yarmouk Symphony, and for his three-act opera The Death of Cleopatra, which is based on the epic poem by Ahmed Shawqi.

External links
Sayed Awad page
Sayed Awad page

See also
List of Egyptian composers

20th-century classical composers
Egyptian composers
Egyptian violinists
1926 births
2000 deaths
20th-century violinists
Male classical composers
20th-century male musicians
Egyptian expatriates in Jordan